Skolebakken railway halt is a railway halt serving the central part of the city of Aarhus in Jutland, Denmark. The station is located on the Grenaa Line between Aarhus and Grenaa. In 2016, the station was temporarily closed along with the Grenaa Line while it's being reconstructed to form part of the Aarhus light rail system. It reopened as such in 2017, and reopened for trams to Grenaa in 2019.

See also
 List of railway stations in Denmark

References

External links

 Banedanmark
 DSB
 Aarhus Letbane

Railway stations in Aarhus